Peter Konwitschny (born 21 January 1945 in Frankfurt am Main) is a German opera and theatre director.

Biography

Peter Konwitschny grew up in Leipzig, where his father Franz Konwitschny was principal conductor of the Leipzig Gewandhaus Orchestra. After an aborted study of physics, he  studied theatre direction from 1965 until 1970 in Berlin.

In the 1970s, Konwitschny worked as an assistant director with Ruth Berghaus at the Berliner Ensemble. From 1980 onwards he chiefly worked as a free-lance director. During this period he directed both opera and theatre productions in Berlin, Halle, Greifswald and Rostock. From 1986 until 1990 he was chief director of the Landestheater Halle. His Handel productions Rinaldo, Aci, Galatea e Polifemo and Tamerlano, as well as Rigoletto and Carmen received high acclaim.

Even though Konwitschny had already directed operas in West Germany (Bluebeard's Castle, Kassel, 1987, and Fidelio, Basel, 1989), it was only after the fall of the Berlin Wall, that his international career took off. After Puccini and Rossini operas in Graz, Leipzig and Basel, Konwitschny turned to Wagner: Parsifal (1995, Bavarian State Opera), Tannhäuser (1997, Dresden Semperoper), Lohengrin (1998, Hamburg State Opera), Tristan und Isolde (1998, Bavarian State Opera), and a highly acclaimed Götterdämmerung (2000, Staatsoper Stuttgart).

After Lohengrin, Konwitschny returned to Hamburg to cooperate with the conductor Ingo Metzmacher on Alban Berg's Lulu,  Richard Wagner's Die Meistersinger von Nürnberg, and Arnold Schoenberg's Moses und Aron. In 2004 he directed Wagner's The Flying Dutchman at the Bolshoi Theatre in Moscow, in 2005 Richard Strauss' Elektra in Copenhagen and in 2009 Strauss' Salome in Amsterdam. Since August 2008, Konwitschny is principal director of productions at the Leipzig Opera.

In 2018, Konwitschny, was fired from the Gothenburg Opera due to a conflict between Peter Konwitschny and co-workers around the stage, during the rehearsals of Boris Godunov. The Gothenburg Opera CEO stated in a press release that This is a house where one is allowed to be angry, have conflicts and to make mistakes. But there is a limit to where a behavior towards co-workers becomes unacceptable. In this case, we could not afterwards reach a mutual understanding concerning the gravity of the situation. Therefore, we chose to terminate the cooperation. Konwitschny later issued a statement to the press, comparing the response to the Spanish Inquisition and vowing not to return to the opera house.

Awards
 1988: Art Prize of the German Democratic Republic
 1992: Konrad Wolf Prize of the Akademie der Künste in Berlin
 1997: Order of Merit of the Federal Republic of Germany
 1998: Director of the Year, Opernwelt magazine
 1999: Director of the Year, Opernwelt magazine
 2000: Director of the Year, Opernwelt magazine
 2005: Theaterpreis Berlin
Konwitschny is an honorary professor at the Hochschule für Musik "Hanns Eisler" in Berlin and a member of the Akademie der Künste in Berlin.

Acclaim and critique
Some of Konwitschny's polarizing interpretations are far removed from the composer's or playwright's original idea. His 2000 production in Dresden of Die Csárdásfürstin, an operetta by Emmerich Kálmán, set by Konwitschny in World War I trenches, turned into a scandal and a lawsuit when the director of the Semperoper cancelled two scenes of Konwitschny's production.

References

External links
 Interview: "I do not consider myself a representative of the Regietheater" by Per-Erik Skarmstad and Mostly Opera, at wagneropera.net

1945 births
German theatre directors
People from Leipzig
German opera directors
Living people
Recipients of the Cross of the Order of Merit of the Federal Republic of Germany
Recipients of the Art Prize of the German Democratic Republic
Members of the Academy of Arts, Berlin
Academic staff of the Hochschule für Musik Hanns Eisler Berlin